|}

The Royal Lodge Stakes is a Group 2 flat horse race in Great Britain open to two-year-old colts and geldings. It is run on the Rowley Mile at Newmarket over a distance of 1 mile (1,609 metres), and it is scheduled to take place each year in late September.

History
The event was established in 1946, and it was originally held at Ascot. It is named after Royal Lodge, a royal residence located in Windsor Great Park. It was initially contested over 5 furlongs and open to horses of either gender. It was extended to a mile in 1948, and restricted to colts and geldings in 1987.

The race was first staged at Newmarket in 2005, when Ascot was closed for redevelopment. It was transferred more permanently in 2011.

The Royal Lodge Stakes is sometimes included in the Breeders' Cup Challenge series, with the winner earning an automatic invitation to compete in the Breeders' Cup Juvenile Turf. Its latest period of inclusion began in 2012.

The race is currently held on the final day of Newmarket's three-day Cambridgeshire Meeting, the same day as the Cambridgeshire Handicap.

Records

Leading jockey (8 wins):
 Lester Piggott – Pinched (1957), St Paddy (1959), Casabianca (1963), Soft Angels (1965), Royal Palace (1966), Remand (1967), Sir Wimborne (1975), Dunbeath (1982)

Leading trainer (8 wins):
 Noel Murless – Pinched (1957), St Paddy (1959), Casabianca (1963), Soft Angels (1965), Royal Palace (1966), Domineering (1969), Yaroslav (1971), Adios (1972)

Winners since 1976

Earlier winners

 1946: Royal Barge
 1947: Black Tarquin
 1948: Swallow Tail
 1949: Tabriz
 1950: Fraise du Bois II
 1951: Khor Mousa
 1952: Neemah
 1953: Infatuation
 1954: Solarium
 1955: Royal Splendour
 1956: Noble Venture
 1957: Pinched
 1958: Cantelo
 1959: St Paddy
 1960: Beta *
 1961: Escort
 1962: Star Moss
 1963: Casabianca *
 1964: Prominer
 1965: Soft Angels
 1966: Royal Palace
 1967: Remand
 1968: Dutch Bells
 1969: Domineering
 1970: Sea Friend
 1971: Yaroslav
 1972: Adios
 1973: Straight as a Die
 1974: no race
 1975: Sir Wimborne

* The 1960 and 1963 runnings took place at Newbury.

See also
Horse racing in Great Britain
List of British flat horse races
Road to the Kentucky Derby

References

 Paris-Turf: 
 Racing Post:

 galopp-sieger.de – Royal Lodge Stakes.
 ifhaonline.org – International Federation of Horseracing Authorities – Royal Lodge Stakes (2019).
 pedigreequery.com – Royal Lodge Stakes.
 

Flat races in Great Britain
Newmarket Racecourse
Flat horse races for two-year-olds
Breeders' Cup Challenge series
Recurring sporting events established in 1946
1946 establishments in England